The Burkinabe ambassador in Brussels is the official representative of the Government in Ouagadougou to the European Commission.
She is regularly accredited as Ambassador to the Court of St James's, Ambassador to the Belgian, Dutch, Luxembourger and Irish Government and as representative to the Organisation for the Prohibition of Chemical Weapons.

List of representatives

References 

 
European Commission
Burkina Faso